Sheykh Fozeyl (also Romanized as Sheykh Foẕeyl; also known as Sheykh Foẕeylī) is a village in Mollasani Rural District, in the Central District of Bavi County, Khuzestan Province, Iran. At the 2006 census, its population was 69, in 16 families.

References 

Populated places in Bavi County